Mercy, Mercy is a 1968 live album by the Buddy Rich Big Band, recorded at Caesars Palace.

Track listing 
LP side A
 "Mercy, Mercy, Mercy" (Joe Zawinul) – 5:34
 "Preach and Teach" (Johnny Burch) – 4:06
 "Channel One Suite" (Bill Reddie) – 12:50
LP side B
 "Big Mama Cass" (Don Sebesky) – 3:22
 "Goodbye Yesterday" (Don Piestrup) – 6:18
 "Acid Truth" (Don Menza) – 5:50
 "Alfie" (Burt Bacharach, Hal David) – 3:49
 "Ode to Billie Joe" (Bobby Gentry) – 3:39
Bonus tracks added to 1997  Blue Note CD reissue 
 "Chavala" (Jerry Bock, Sheldon Harnick) – 5:20
 "Mr. Lucky" (Jerry Livingston, Henry Mancini) – 5:47
 "Chelsea Bridge" (Billy Strayhorn) – 5:09

Personnel 
The Buddy Rich big band
 Buddy Rich - drums
 Walter Namuth - guitar
 Gary Walters - double bass, electric bass
 Joe Azarello - piano
 Charles Owens - alto saxophone  
 Art Pepper - alto saxophone 
 Pat LaBarbera - tenor saxophone
 Don Menza - tenor saxophone
 John Laws - baritone saxophone
 Jim Trimble - trombone
 Rick Stepton - trombone 
 Peter Graves - bass trombone
 Al Porcino - trumpet
 David Culp - trumpet 
 Kenneth Faulk - trumpet 
 Bill Prince - trumpet
Arrangers:
 Don Menza 
 Allyn Ferguson 
 Charles Owens
 Don Piestrup
 Bill Reddie
 Don Sebesky
 Phil Wilson
Production
 
 Bob Belden - producer
 Richard Bock - producer
 Dean Pratt - producer
 Bill Porter – engineer
 Gabor Halmos - cover design
 David Redfern - photography
 Ron Waller - photography
 Peter Whorf - photography

References 

 Pacific Jazz ST 20133
 Blue Note 54331 (1997 CD re-issue)
 Mercy, Mercy at discogs.com

Buddy Rich live albums
1968 live albums
Albums arranged by Allyn Ferguson
Albums arranged by Don Sebesky
Blue Note Records live albums
Pacific Jazz Records live albums